The SP-059 is a highway in the southeastern part of the state of São Paulo in Brazil.  The highway is unnamed on its entire length. The highway links the highways Rodovia Anchieta (SP-150) and Imigrantes (SP-160), it enters the Planalto Interlink between the two highways, the SP-150 and the SP-160.  It runs entirely in the municipality of Cubatão. The highway concessions is controlled by the transportation company EcoRodovias.

References 

59
Highways in São Paulo (state)